Khalid Deeb (born 7 April 1982) is an Australian professional rugby league footballer who last played for the Cabramatta Two Blues in the Ron Massey Cup competition. He also played for Newtown in the NSW Cup competition and Sydney Roosters in the NRL competition. He played internationally for Lebanon.

Playing career
Deeb played with the Auburn Warriors as a junior. Deeb made his only first-grade appearance for the Sydney Roosters in the 2009 NRL season in a round 25 38–4 loss away to Melbourne Storm, where he came off the bench.

In this same season, he won the Best and Fairest award along with Best Forward awards for Newtown. He played in the Jim Beam Cup finals with Newtown in 2006 and with the Sydney Bulls in 2007.

In 2017, Deeb played for the Cabramatta Two Blues in the Ron Massey Cup.

References

1982 births
Living people
Auburn Warriors players
Australian people of Lebanese descent
Australian rugby league players
Cabramatta Two Blues players
Lebanon national rugby league team captains
Lebanon national rugby league team players
Newtown Jets NSW Cup players
Rugby league players from Sydney
Rugby league props
Rugby league second-rows
Sportspeople of Lebanese descent
Sydney Bulls players
Sydney Roosters players